Úlfar Þórðarson (2 August 1911 – 28 February 2002) was an Icelandic water polo player. He competed in the men's tournament at the 1936 Summer Olympics.

References

1911 births
2002 deaths
Icelandic male water polo players
Olympic water polo players of Iceland
Water polo players at the 1936 Summer Olympics